Women's football is not a popular sport in San Marino, no women's national association football team exists, and the national football association does not have a full-time staff member working on the sport.

Background and development
Football is the fourth most popular women's sport in the country, behind volleyball which is the most popular. In 2006, there were 65 total registered female footballers in the country, 48 of which were senior players over 17 years of age.  That year, there were 16 football clubs in the country, only one of which was open to women to play on mixed gender teams.

Women's football is represented in Federazione Sammarinese Gioco Calcio, the national football association, by specific mandate.  They do not have a full-time staffer dedicated to women's football. Less than 5% of the national federation's budget is earmarked for women's football compared to 22% for men's competitions and 9% for youth competitions. In 2009, Caesar Biordi was in charge of women's football in the country.

By September 2020, the country has a women's club, San Marino Academy, which competes in the Italian Serie A. Eleonora Cecchini is the only Sammarinese player of the team.

References

Women's association football in Europe
Football in San Marino